The Hague Justice Portal (in French: 'Portail judiciaire de La Haye' ) is a website that promotes, and provides greater access to, the institutions, courts and organisations in The Hague, The Netherlands, working in the field of international peace, justice and security. The Portal was officially launched by Her Royal Highness Princess Margriet of the Netherlands in The Hague on 6 April 2006.

The Portal is a gateway to the legal activities taking place in The Hague, a city which, in the words of former United Nations Secretary-General, Mr. Kofi Annan, "amply deserves its reputation as the International City of Peace and Justice".

An innovative project created by the Hague Academic Coalition, the Portal was officially launched in April 2006. In addition to the core legal institutions in The Hague such as the International Court of Justice, the International Criminal Court and the International Criminal Tribunal for the former Yugoslavia, the Portal promotes, and provides greater access to, the work and the development of the large number of other international organisations, institutes and research centres based in The Hague, which are relevant to the pursuit of international peace, justice and security.

The management of the Portal was transferred to a committee led by  Philipp Amann on the 1st of March 2014 and a new stream-lined version of the website was created.  The new committee are based in The Hague and have a strong vision for the future of the site.

Sections of the Portal
The Portal itself comprises five main sections: ‘News and Events’, ‘Projects’, ‘Academic Research’, ‘The Hague’ and ‘Portal’.

News and Events: This news section includes up-to-date information about what happens in the international courts and about their crucial judgments and decisions, issued from official sources and edited by legal experts. The event calendar announces legal events, conferences, lectures and speeches taking place in The Hague.

Academic Research: This is the focal point of the Portal where court documents, commentaries, articles, press releases and an important bibliography of books are accessible. The Hague Justice Journal – Journal Judiciaire de La Haye contains articles and commentaries by expert commentators analysing legal issues, as well as an overview of recent decisions.

Projects: Currently, the Hague Justice Portal has two specific projects. The first one is undertaken in close collaboration with the Permanent Court of Arbitration (PCA) for the sake of digitalising a number of the Court’s historic international arbitral awards which were previously unavailable in electronic format. The second one is called the DomCLIC project, which is a pilot for an ever-expanding database of domestic jurisprudence relating to international criminal law from countries all over the world.
In April 2014, Colette O'Donovan agreed to lead a new project. The Hague Justice Gender Project will focus on raising awareness of issues and events specifically relating to gender in international law.

The Hague: This part of the website offers an interesting insight into the city of The Hague. Whether you are a tourist or an expatriate, or consider moving to The Hague, the Portal wishes to guide you in your first steps. Visitors also have access to a vacancy list of job opportunities in the city, including legal and justice-related employment and internship positions.

Portal: This final section provides information about the Hague Academic Coalition(HAC) to which the Portal pertains. This consortium of institutions that work in the fields of international relations and international law offers their latest publications and research papers.

Reception by jurists
The Portal has already acquired considerable attention from the community of jurists.

Having historical PCA arbitration awards on line, freely-accessible and in one place, is helpful to researchers.
Information is also easily available on such important cases as that of Slobodan Milošević, Charles G. Taylor, Thomas Lubanga Dyilo and Vojislav Šešelj.

For the first time, persons around the world will be able to monitor ICC trials.  Cornell Law School's web site, a well-used web site for legal research, now links to the Portal.  The International Justice Tribune, another site for International law also links to the Portal.  Several scholars so far have used and cited the Portal in their research, one about the David Hicks case, and another about the Hariri Tribunal.

References

Legal websites
International Court of Justice
Dutch websites
International law
Organisations based in The Hague
Organizations established in 2006